Micralarctia is a genus of moth in the family Erebidae from the Afrotropics.

Species
 Micralarctia australis Watson, 1988 [1889]
 Micralarctia punctulatum (Wallengren, 1860)
 Micralarctia punctulatum auricinctum (Butler, 1897)
 Micralarctia punctulatum euproctina (Aurivillius, 1899 [1900])
 Micralarctia punctulatum pura (Butler, 1878)
 Micralarctia semipura (Bartel, 1903)
 Micralarctia toulgoeti Watson, 1988 [1889]

References
 , 1989: A review of Spilosoma-like Afrotropical tiger-moths (Lepidoptera: Arctiidae). Entomologica Scandinavica 19: 251-291.
Natural History Museum Lepidoptera generic names catalog

Spilosomina
Moth genera